Krplivnik is a village on the right bank of the Big Krka River in the Municipality of Hodoš in the Prekmurje region of Slovenia. It is separated into two hamlets: Veliki Krplivnik in the west and Mali Krplivnik to the east, right on the border with Hungary.

References

External links 
Krplivnik on Geopedia

Populated places in the Municipality of Hodoš